The least chub (Iotichthys phlegethontis) is a species of ray-finned fish in the family Cyprinidae, the only member of the genus Iotichthys.

This species is found only in Utah in the United States. Its native habitat formerly included much of the Bonneville Basin and it was widely distributed in freshwater ponds, swamps, springs, and tributaries around the Great Salt Lake, Utah Lake and Sevier Lake. Populations were also abundant in springs within the Snake and Utah valleys. Due to habitat degradation and introduction of non-native fishes, it is currently limited to a few spring complexes. 
The least chub is a small minnow, with a maximum size of less than 2.5 inches. It is the smallest of seven chubs native to Utah. Least chub eat primarily algae and small invertebrates, including mosquito larvae.
Spawning occurs during the spring and early summer. Eggs are fertilized in the water, and then sink until they attach to vegetation or the substrate. No parental care is given to eggs or young. The least chub is a schooling species that prefers areas of dense vegetation in slow-moving water.

The least chub populations suffered a steep decline in the 1940s and 50s, though the decline wasn't noticed until the 70s. Reasons for the decline include habitat destruction from cattle grazing on and trampling streamside vegetation, water diversion, mineral and energy development, and non-native fishes. Studies indicate that where non-native fishes such as largemouth bass, trout, and mosquitofish are introduced, few if any least chub remain.

Though the distribution of the least chub is still limited, the Utah Division of Wildlife Resources and other conservation groups have reintroduced the fish into suitable habitats, often removing non-native fish prior to stocking. Other conservation efforts include working with ranchers to fence off critical spring complexes to prevent habitat destruction from cattle grazing. 
Recently the Utah Division of Wildlife Resources teamed up with mosquito abatement districts in Davis and Salt Lake counties (Utah) to distribute the fish to 240 backyard ponds to evaluate it as a potential mosquitofish replacement. Researchers will monitor how well the chub compete against the more aggressive mosquitofish in ponds where they are both stocked. Ponds with only the least chub will be monitored to determine whether they can control mosquito larvae as effectively as the mosquitofish or if more chubs will be required to do the same job.

References

 Muck, J. 1999. Endangered Species Bulletin September/October 1999.  Downloaded 3, June 2008.
Dougherty, Joseph M. 2008. "Least-likely aquatic champion to take on top mosquito-eater" Deseret News Feb 3, 2008. Downloaded 3 June 2008.

Chubs (fish)
Leuciscinae
Endemic fauna of Utah
Monotypic fish genera
Fish described in 1874
Taxonomy articles created by Polbot